The 2013 Serendra explosion was an explosion that occurred in the Two Serendra condominium complex occurred in Taguig, Metro Manila, Philippines. The explosion killed at least 3 people, and another 5 were injured in the area.

Overview 
Interior Secretary Mar Roxas confirmed that only three persons were killed and five were injured in Friday night's Two Serendra blast that rocked the Bonifacio Global City (BGC), in Taguig last Friday. The Office of the Civil Defense, meanwhile, apologized for releasing wrong information on the number of fatalities from the condo blast. It earlier said that six people died in the explosion. The fatalities were identified as Salimar Natividad, driver of the Abenson delivery van along with two crew members Jeffrey Umali and Marlon Bandiola. Roxas said. The victims' closed van was crushed by a concrete wall that was blown off the Unit 501 of Two Serendra as they were passing by McKinley Parkway road. It then collided with a Hyundai Starex van driven by Orlando Agravante, who was unhurt. The explosion which happened at about 8 p.m. also injured Angelito San Juan, tenant of unit 501 of Two Serendra, who suffered burns. He was brought to the intensive care unit of the St. Luke's Medical Center, in BGC.

The other injured victims were identified as Allen Poole, an American and tenant of unit 683 who suffered cuts from shattered glass, and three passersby identified as Louise Lorenzo, a 9-year-old girl; Janice Nicole Bonjoc; and 19-year-old Joy Garcia. Although bomb-sniffing dogs from the police and the Philippine Army did not detect any bomb residues from Unit 501, Roxas said they are not ruling out a possible bomb attack. Roxas said that the K9 dogs deployed never even barked nor stayed in a spot. He said that based on investigations, the explosion generated a fire that traveled between the floor levels of the condominium building. A used fire extinguisher was earlier found at unit 506.

Gas Leak Causes

The condo unit owner and the building's developer may be liable for negligence that resulted in a gas leak that led to the May 31 deadly explosion at Two Serendra condominium in Taguig, Interior and Local Government Secretary Mar Roxas said Thursday. Citing the findings of the inter-agency task force and foreign experts that looked into the incident, Roxas said the leak in Unit 501-B was caused by the "unauthorized movement of the gas range (which) caused a detachment of the gas supply hose." The explosion occurred when the leak was ignited by a light switch, he said. The tenant, one of four people who died as a result of the blast, was not alerted of the leakage because the "vaporized" LPG used in Serendra's pipeline system was odorless, Roxas added. That attitude of the Ayala Land developer and the cooking-gas supplier led to the blast that killed four people at the residential block Two Serendra in Taguig on May 31, Interior Secretary Mar Roxas said on Thursday. The Ayala-owned Serendra Inc., in a statement issued Thursday, said that it had taken note of the findings of the interagency task force that investigated the explosion and that it remained “confident that government regulations and standards have been complied within the design and operation of Serendra.” Serendra Inc. promised to work with the government for the improvement of those standards and adhere to any changes in regulations. “Once again, we wish to express our regret over the incident. The conclusion of the IATF investigation will allow us to expedite the conduct of repairs and restoration of the damaged building so the affected residents can return to their units as the soonest possible time,” the company said. An explosion ripped through an apartment on the fifth floor of Two Serendra at 8:30 p.m. on May 31, blowing off an entire wall and sending it flying across the road below. The wall crashed on a passing delivery van of a prominent chain of appliance stores, killing the vehicle’s three occupants. Five others, including an American and a 9-year-old child, were injured. Angelito San Juan, the renter of the apartment who was vacationing from the United States, suffered serious burns and died in hospital a month later. The government investigation by the task force, led by Roxas, began on June 1. to continue, especially in this kind of sensitive matter [involving] the vaporized distribution system of gas,” Roxas said, as he presented the final findings of the task force at a news conference in Camp Crame on Thursday. Roxas reiterated the previous finding of the task force that the blast that destroyed Unit 501-B in Two Serendra was not caused by a bomb, but by liquefied petroleum gas (LPG) that leaked from the main gas supply line of the building. Justice for victims Roxas said the task force identified the possible liabilities in the explosion of Makati Development Corp. (MDC), the property developer of Two Serendra, and Bonifacio Gas Corp. (BGC), the supplier of LPG to the building. Both companies belong to the Ayala Corporation. Also facing possible charges are the owner and caretaker of Unit 501-B, officials of RM Larido Construction Services, which renovated the apartment, and Two Serendra Inc. Gas range moved Citing the final task force report, Roxas said investigators discovered that the workers of RM Larido Construction Services, with the consent of the owner, Marianne Cayton-Castillo, moved the gas range in Unit 501-B by 22.9 centimeters from its original position when they renovated the apartment. Roxas said the paint drippings on the hose of the gas range, which connects it to the main gas line, showed that the hose was lying on the floor when the explosion happened.

The investigators also noted that the steel clamp used to lock the hose connected to the gas range’s nozzle was found far from where it should be, which meant that the workers did not properly refit the hose, “This is the proximate cause of the gas leak. We found out that the workers were not authorized to move the gas range. It was not part of the approved renovation works,” he said. He said three employees of the construction firm admitted that they moved the gas range, even if it was not part of the renovation program. The accumulated gas fumes inside the room was ignited when the light switch was turned on, he added. Safety gadgets failed the explosion could have been prevented had the gas leak detector and automatic shutoff valve of the gas range, and the separate LPG leak detector gadget of the building functioned properly. “But the gas leak detector and the automatic shutoff valve are connected to the main electrical line of the gas range, which was unplugged at the time of the incident,” the building’s only gas leak detector did not activate after a power outage in the area hours before the blast. Roxas said he had briefed the President on the final report of the task force, which would be submitted to the Department of Justice, Department of Energy, Department of Public Works and Highways and other governmental agencies. Foreign experts The government, Roxas said, sought the help of New York-based Kroll, Inc. Advisory Solutions, headed by certified fire investigator James William Munday, for an independent investigation of the blast. the government paid $67,500, or about P3 million, to Kroll, which had investigated similar blasts in other parts of the country. He said it would be up to the justice department to determine if the groups and individuals involved could be held liable for civil and criminal offenses. Asked why the task force did not recommend the filing of charges against MDC, BGC and the others, Roxas said: “This is the first time that something like this happened in our country and that’s why we focused on [the scientific investigation].” “If what happened and other contributing elements constitute legal liabilities, it’s better to let the lawyers determine them. If this was a brawl, stabbing or shooting incident, the police would know how to investigate it. But this is something more complex,” he said. Roxas added: “Our investigators were asked to ascertain facts based on science, not to include legal liabilities. That task belongs to the government prosecutors and the courts.”

See also
2007 Glorietta explosion

References

Explosions in 2013
Serendra explosion, 2007
History of Metro Manila